David Drake (July 9, 1918 – August 9, 1995) was an American football coach.  He was the second head football coach at Azusa Pacific College—now known as Azusa Pacific University—in Azusa, California, serving for one season, in 1966, and compiling a record of 5–4.

References

1918 births
1995 deaths
Azusa Pacific Cougars football coaches